Film censorship in Malaysia is pervasive, and the Film Censorship Board of Malaysia (Malay: Lembaga Penapis Filem) is the government ministry that which dictates whether, when, and how a film gets released in the country. It is under the control of the Ministry of Home Affairs  (Malay: Kementerian Dalam Negeri). The government censors film content for mainly homosexual, political and religious reasons.

The two main cinema operators in Malaysia, Golden Screen Cinemas and Tanjung Golden Village, are known to be strict in ensuring that only patrons aged 18 and above are allowed to view films rated "18". Although movies shown in Malaysian cinemas carry an age-restricted rating such as "18", films that contain scenes of sex and nudity are completely censored off by the LPF (Malaysia's film censorship board), which renders the 18 rating meaningless and strict entry by the cinema operators pointless. 

Kissing and make-out scenes are also censored in movies rated "P13" but in recent years the Board has loosened the censorship. On the other hand, there have been many "18" rated films filled with profanity and graphic violence that were hardly censored or uncensored in recent years. This shows that the board mostly views sex and nudity as completely unacceptable for a Malaysian audience.

Rating system

The rating system for movies shown in Malaysian cinemas was introduced in 1996 and the classification system for approved films is as follows:

U (Umum/Universal: "General Audiences") - For general audiences. (Used by the majority of films screened in Malaysia until 2008 but it continues only for television, notably for RTM.)
P13 (Penjaga 13 : "Parental Guidance 13") - Parental guidance required for audiences under the age of 13. (Introduced in 2006, this became the official Malaysian motion picture rating system in 2008. The "PG-13" rating was revised to "P13" from April 2012 onwards to emphasize the use of Malay language instead of English.) (Passionate kissing scenes are not allowed under a P13 rating)
18SG (Seram, Ganas: "Graphic Violence and Horror/Terror") - Film may contain strong violence, gore or horror/terror people may find objectionable.
18SX (Seks: "Sexual Content") - Film may contain sex scenes, nudity or sexual dialogue/references people may find objectionable (despite scenes of sex and nudity being strictly censored off by the LPF)
18PA (Politik, Agama: "Strong Religious or Political Elements") - Film may contain elements which include religious, social or political aspects people may find objectionable. (Rarely used)
18PL (Pelbagai: "Various") - Film may contain strong violence, gore, horror/terror, sex scenes, nudity, sexual dialogues/references, religious, social or political aspects people may find objectionable. (The majority of the 18+ movies use this rating. For example, a film with sex scenes and strong violence will be classified as 18PL.) (despite scenes of sex and nudity being strictly censored off by the LPF)

The four 18 categories are now superseded by the simplified 18 rating, which makes no distinction on what type of objectionable content is contained within the movie. Films with an 18 rating are only restricted for audiences age 18 and above.

Banned films

Over the years, various films has been banned in Malaysia.

On 4 March 2007, the Malaysian Censorship Board decided to ban Tsai Ming-liang's film, I Don't Want to Sleep Alone, based on 18 counts of incidents shown in the film depicting the country "in a bad light" for cultural, ethical, and racial reasons. However, they later allowed the film to be screened in the country after Tsai agreed to censor parts of the film according to the requirements of the Censorship Board.

Further reading

References

External links
 List of All Films Banned in Malaysia at IMDB